Modern Mongolia inherited a relatively good healthcare system from its socialist period, a world bank report from 2007 notes "despite its low per capita income, Mongolia has relatively strong health indicators; a reflection of the important health gains achieved during the socialist period." On average Mongolia's infant mortality rate is less than half of that of similarly economically developed countries, its under-five mortality rate and life expectancy are all better on average than other nations with similar GDP per capita.

Since 1990, key health indicators in Mongolia like life expectancy and infant and child mortality have steadily improved, both due to social changes and to improvement in the health sector. Echinococcosis was one of the commonest surgical diagnoses in the 1960s, but now has been greatly reduced. Yet, adult health deteriorated during the 1990s and the first decade of the 21st century and mortality rates increased significantly.  Smallpox, typhus, plague, poliomyelitis, and diphtheria were eradicated by 1981.  The Mongolian Red Cross Society focuses on preventive work. The Confederation of Mongolian Trade Unions established a network of sanatoriums.

Serious problems remain, especially in the countryside. According to a 2011 study by the World Health Organization, Mongolia's capital city, Ulaanbaatar, has the second highest level of fine particle pollution of any city in the world. Poor air quality is also the largest occupational hazard, as over two-thirds of occupational disease in Mongolia is dust induced chronic bronchitis or pneumoconiosis.

Average childbirth (fertility rate) is around 2.25–1.87 per woman (2007) and average life expectancy is 68.5 years (2011). Infant mortality is at 1.9% to 4% and child mortality is at 4.3%.

Mongolia has the highest rate of liver cancer in the world by a significant margin.

The Human Rights Measurement Initiative finds that Mongolia is fulfilling 78.7% of what it should be fulfilling for the right to health based on its level of income. When looking at the right to health with respect to children, Mongolia achieves 96.2% of what is expected based on its current income. In regards to the right to health amongst the adult population, the country achieves only 79.2% of what is expected based on the nation's level of income.  Mongolia falls into the "very bad" category when evaluating the right to reproductive health because the nation is fulfilling only 60.8% of what the nation is expected to achieve based on the resources (income) it has available.

Healthcare

History
Before the 1920s Mongolia had no medical services aside from what was provided by the Lama's. Healthcare in Mongolia was developed from 1922 under the Soviet Semashko model with a large hospital and clinical network. This needed a large supply of clinically trained staff, which was not forthcoming. The isolation of the country meant that developments in medicine were slow to reach it. The ratio of doctors to the general population increased dramatically, so that in 1990, there were more than 6,000 physicians, three-quarters of whom were women.The medical care system was accessible at little or no cost even in the most remote areas. State-sponsored maternity rest homes for pastoral women in the last stages of pregnancy helped to lower infant mortality from 109 per 1,000 live births in 1960 to 57.4 in 1990, and maternal mortality by about 25 percent from 1960 to 1990. As recently as 2000 there were only 106 anaesthetists in the country.

Legal framework
The Ministry of Health is responsible for the provision of Public healthcare under the Citizen’s Health Insurance Law. Citizens are legally required to register and have annual check-ups. Finance is through the Health Insurance Fund established in 1994. Patients are required to make copayments of 10% for secondary care and 15% for tertiary care. in 2009  out-of-pocket payments made up 49% of total health expenditure.

Traditional medicine
Until the end of the 19th century, medical services were provided by Buddhist monks who practised traditional medicine and knew Chinese, Tibetan, and Indian remedies.

Mongolian traditional medicine was repressed after 1922 but is now recognized.  The Institute of Traditional Medicine was established in 1961, and the Institute of Natural Compounds in 1973. The National Specialized Hospital caters for traditional medicine patients and has 100 beds. It sees 40-50 outpatients daily.  In 2006 about 5% of all hospital in-patients were treated by traditional medicine. In 2012 there were 82 private traditional medicine clinics, 63 of them in Ulaanbaatar. Since 1990 the Mongolian National University of Medical Sciences has had a Traditional Medicine Faculty.  In 2007 there were 1,538 doctors trained in traditional medicine.

Antibiotics
Mongolia had the highest consumption of antibiotics of any country in the world in 2015 with a rate of 64.4 defined daily doses per 1,000 inhabitants per day.

Facilities
A hierarchy of clinics and hospitals was established in the 1980s. A somon medical station, with a doctor, then an inter-somon hospital, covering a wider area and above that an aymag general hospital covering an area of about a 200-kilometre radius. An Aymag hospital would have more than 100 beds. A somon hospital has 10 to 20 beds and 1 or 2 general practitioners. There were 4,600 physicians in the country in 1985, 24.8 per 10,000 people.  About half of them were in Ulaanbaatar where there was an oncology centre and a 600-bed isolation hospital for infectious diseases. There were about 8,500 nurses and 3,800 physician's assistants. In 1986 there were 112 hospitals.   The Health Insurance Fund will not pay for people who go directly to hospitals without a referral.

The health sector comprises 17 specialized hospitals and centers, 4 regional diagnostic and treatment centers, 9 district and 21 aimag general hospitals, 323 soum hospitals, 18 feldsher posts, 233 family group practices, 536 private hospitals, and 57 drug supply companies/pharmacies. In 2002, the total number of health workers was 33,273, of whom 6823 were doctors, 788 pharmacists, 7802 nurses, and 14,091 mid-level personnel. At present, there are 27.7 physicians and 75.7 hospital beds per 10,000 inhabitants.

Military medicine
The Mongolian armed forces run a Hospital Unit in Darfur with 68 personnel, 34 men and 34 women, which provides health care, emergency resuscitation and stabilization,  surgical interventions, and basic dental care for UN personnel. It administers vaccinations and other preventive measures. It has also treated more than 10,000 people from the local communities.

Hospitals
There has been a reduction in the number of public hospitals since 1998. The number of private hospitals (mostly very small) and clinics has increased from 683 in 2005 to 1184 in 2011.

Hospitals in Ulaanbaatar
Intermed Hospital a private hospital established in 2014
Achtan Hospital
Grand Med Hospital
Second Hospital
Songdo Hospital, private, associated with the Bumrungrad International Hospital
State Central Clinic Hospital, established in 1925.  Formerly known as Hospital-1.  Rebuilt 1971 with assistance of the Czech Republic. A tertiary centre with 13 departments, 180 doctors and 544 beds.
Traumatology Hospital
Yonsei Friendship Hospital
Third State Central Hospital of Mongolia,  the only hospital with a stroke center.

Pharmacies
132 items are included on the Essential Drugs List. If they are prescribed in the public health system pharmacies are reimbursed for 50-80% of the price, which is controlled. Medication is not always available in rural areas.  There are 5 traditional medicine manufacturing units and they produce more than 200 types of traditional medicine.  The total value in 2009 was US$1.4 million.  30 traditional products have been registered and some are included on the Essential Drugs List.

References